Emmanuel Okwudili (born 24 December 1983) is a Nigerian cricketer. He played in the 2014 ICC World Cricket League Division Five tournament.

References

External links
 

1983 births
Living people
Nigerian cricketers
Place of birth missing (living people)